Rosendal Castle  is in Helsingborg Municipality, Scania, Sweden.
Construction was started in 1615 during the ownership of Anders Stensson Bille på Råbelöv (1578-1633) who was Riksråd  and sheriff  at Helsingborg.

See also
List of castles in Sweden

References

Helsingborg
Castles in Skåne County